Edwin C. Daw was an English professional footballer who played as a goalkeeper.

Career
Daw played for Doncaster Rovers, Bradford City and Oldham Athletic. For Bradford City he made 16 appearances in the Football League; he also made 3 appearances in the FA Cup.

Sources

References

Year of birth missing
Year of death missing
English footballers
Doncaster Rovers F.C. players
Bradford City A.F.C. players
Oldham Athletic A.F.C. players
English Football League players
Association football goalkeepers